Jagdeep Singh may refer to:

 Jagdeep Singh (basketball) (born 1986), Indian basketball player
 Jagdeep Singh Sidhu, Indian film director
 Jagdeep Singh (politician) (born 1971), Indian politician
 Jagdeep Singh (kabaddi), Indian kabaddi player